Soro (Sl. No.: 41) is a Vidhan Sabha constituency of Balasore district, Odisha.

This constituency includes Soro, Soro block and 16 GPs (Anji, Aruhabad, Avana, Bahanaga, Baripada, Bishnupur, Chittol, Dandaharipur, Gopalpur, Kalyani, Kharsahapur, Kochiakoili, Kuruda, Sahaspura, Saud and Talakurunia) of Bahanaga block.

Elected Members

15 elections held during 1951 to 2014. Elected members from the Soro constituency are:

2019: Parshuram Dhada (BJD)
2014: Parshuram Dhada (BJD)
2009: Surendra prasad  Parmink INC
2004: Kartik Mohapatra INC
2000: Kartik Mohapatra INC
1995: Kartik Mohapatra INC
1990: Kartik Mohapatra INC
1985: Jadunath Das Mohapatra INC
1980: Pitambar Panda (CPI)
1977: Haraprasad Mahapatra (Janata Party)
1974: Jadunath Das Mohapatra INC
1971: Jadunath Das Mohapatra (Utkal Congress)
1967: Haraprasad Mohapatra ([Swatantra Party])
1961: Karunakar Panigrahi INC
1957: Chaitanya Sethi INC
1951: Nanda Kishore Das INC

2014 Election Result
In 2014 election, Biju Janata Dal candidate Parshuram Dhada defeated Indian National Congress candidate Mrutyunjay Jena by a margin of 4,911 votes.

2009 Election Result
In 2009 election, Indian National Congress candidate Surendra Prasad Pramanik defeated Bharatiya Janata Party candidate Parshuram Dhada by a margin of 360 votes.

Notes

References

Assembly constituencies of Odisha
Balasore district